Israel Salazar may refer to:
 Israel Salazar (singer)
 Israel Salazar (footballer)